Betty Francis [″BF″]  (July 7, 1931 – January 30, 2016) was an American baseball outfielder who played from  through  in the All-American Girls Professional Baseball League.

Born in Maquoketa, Iowa, the stocky Betty Francis played during the last six seasons of the All-American Girls Professional Baseball League.

Basically, Francis was a patient contact hitter with surprising extra base power, compiling a solid 2.73 walk-to-strikeout ratio while connecting 50 of her 331 career hits for extra bases. She also provided strong defense in both outfield corners, showing wide range and a good throwing arm.

Francis first played for the Chicago Colleens rookie development team in 1949. She was promoted to the Muskegon Lassies late in the season, and stayed with the franchise when it was renamed the Kalamazoo Lassies.

Francis played for the Lassies five years, before joining the South Bend Blue Sox in 1954. Her most productive season was with South Bend, when she posted career-numbers in batting average (.350), runs scored (49), home runs (8), runs batted in (58), hits (105) and doubles (12). She had the fifth highest average among all players, while ranking seventh for the most doubles and eighth in RBI .

When her baseball days were over, Francis moved to Chicago, Illinois and worked during 28 years in the Libby's canning company. She also played professional softball in Chicago, accumulating 14 years of amateur ball and 17 years as a professional.

In 1988, Betty Francis became part of Women in Baseball, a permanent display based at the Baseball Hall of Fame and Museum in Cooperstown, New York, which was unveiled to honor the entire All-American Girls Professional Baseball League.

Career statistics
Batting

Fielding

Sources

1931 births
2016 deaths
All-American Girls Professional Baseball League players
Chicago Colleens players
Muskegon Lassies players
Kalamazoo Lassies players
South Bend Blue Sox players
Baseball players from Iowa
People from Maquoketa, Iowa
Baseball players from Chicago
21st-century American women